Sassafras albidum (sassafras, white sassafras, red sassafras, or silky sassafras) is a species of Sassafras native to eastern North America, from southern Maine and southern Ontario west to Iowa, and south to central Florida and eastern Texas. It formerly also occurred in southern Wisconsin, but is extirpated there as a native tree.

Description
The bark on trunk of mature trees is thick, dark red-brown, and deeply furrowed. The shoots are bright yellow green at first with mucilaginous bark, turning reddish brown, and in two or three years begin to show shallow fissures. They come in three different shapes, all of which can be on the same branch; three-lobed leaves, unlobed elliptical leaves, and two-lobed leaves; rarely, there can be more than three lobes. In fall, they turn to shades of yellow, tinged with red. It is usually dioecious, with male and female flowers on separate trees; male flowers have nine stamens, female flowers with six staminodes (aborted stamens) and a 2–3 mm style on a superior ovary. Pollination is by insects. The cotyledons are thick and fleshy. All parts of the plant are aromatic and spicy. The roots are thick and fleshy, and frequently produce root sprouts which can develop into new trees.

Ecology
It prefers rich, well-drained sandy loam with a pH of 6–7, but will grow in any loose, moist soil. Seedlings will tolerate shade, but saplings and older trees demand full sunlight for good growth; in forests it typically regenerates in gaps created by windblow. Root sprouts often result in dense thickets, and a single tree, if allowed to spread unrestrained, will soon be surrounded by a sizable clonal colony, as its roots extend in every direction and send up multitudes of shoots.

S. albidum  is a host plant for the caterpillar of the promethea silkmoth, Callosamia promethea.

Laurel wilt
Laurel wilt is a highly destructive disease initiated when the invasive flying redbay ambrosia beetle (Xyleborus glabratus) introduces its highly virulent fungal symbiont (Raffaelea lauricola) into the sapwood of Lauraceae host shrubs or trees. Sassafras's volatile terpenoids may attract X. glabratus. Sassafras is susceptible to laurel wilt and capable of supporting broods of X. glabratus. Underground transmission of the pathogen through roots and stolons of Sassafras without evidence of X. glabratus attack is suggested. Studies examining the insect's cold tolerance showed that X. glabratus may be able to move to colder northern areas where sassafras would be the main host. The exotic Asian insect is spreading the epidemic from the Everglades through the Carolinas in perhaps less than 15 years by the end of 2014.

Uses

All parts of the Sassafras albidum plant have been used for human purposes, including stems, leaves, bark, wood, roots, fruit, and flowers. Sassafras albidum, while native to North America, is significant to the economic, medical, and cultural history of both Europe and North America. In North America, it has particular culinary significance, being featured in distinct national foods such as traditional root beer, filé powder, and Louisiana Creole cuisine. Sassafras albidum was an important plant to many Native Americans of the southeastern United States and was used for many purposes, including culinary and medicinal purposes, before the European colonization of North America. Its significance for Native Americans is also magnified, as the European quest for sassafras as a commodity for export brought Europeans into closer contact with Native Americans during the early years of European settlement in the 16th and 17th centuries, in Florida, Virginia, and parts of the Northeast.

Use by Native Americans 

Sassafras albidum was a well-used plant by Native Americans in what is now the Southeastern United States prior to the European colonization. The Choctaw word for sassafras is "Kvfi," and it was by them principally as a soup thickener.  It was known as "Winauk" in Delaware and Virginia and is called "Pauame" by the Timuca.

Some Native American tribes used the leaves of sassafras to treat wounds by rubbing the leaves directly into a wound, and used different parts of the plant for many medicinal purposes such as treating acne, urinary disorders, and sicknesses that increased body temperature, such as high fevers. They also used the bark as a dye, and as a flavoring.

Sassafras wood was also used by Native Americans in the Southeastern United States as a fire-starter because of the flammability of its natural oils.

In cooking, sassafras was used by some Native Americans to flavor bear fat, and to cure meats. Sassafras is still used today to cure meats. Use of filé powder by the Choctaw in the Southern United States in cooking is linked to the development of gumbo, a signature dish of Louisiana Creole cuisine.

Modern culinary use and legislation 

Sassafras albidum is used primarily in the United States as the key ingredient in home brewed root beer and as a thickener and flavouring in traditional Louisiana Creole gumbo.

Filé powder, also called gumbo filé, for its use in making gumbo, is a spicy herb made from the dried and ground leaves of the sassafras tree. It was traditionally used by Native Americans in the Southern United States, and was adopted into Louisiana Creole cuisine. Use of filé powder by the Choctaw in the Southern United States in cooking is linked to the development of gumbo, the signature dish of Louisiana Creole cuisine that features ground sassafras leaves. The leaves and root bark can be pulverized to flavor soup and gravy, and meat, respectively.

Sassafras roots are used to make traditional root beer, although they were banned for commercially mass-produced foods and drugs by the U.S. Food and Drug Administration in 1960. Laboratory animals that were given oral doses of sassafras tea or sassafras oil that contained large doses of safrole developed permanent liver damage or various types of cancer. In humans, liver damage can take years to develop and it may not have obvious signs. Along with commercially available sarsaparilla, sassafras remains an ingredient in use among hobby or microbrew enthusiasts. While sassafras is no longer used in commercially produced root beer and is sometimes substituted with artificial flavors, natural extracts with the safrole distilled and removed are available. Most commercial root beers have replaced the sassafras extract with methyl salicylate, the ester found in wintergreen and black birch (Betula lenta) bark.

Sassafras tea was also banned in the U.S. in 1977, but the ban was lifted with the passage of the Dietary Supplement Health and Education Act in 1994.

Safrole oil, aromatic uses, MDA  

Safrole can be obtained fairly easily from the root bark of Sassafras albidum via steam distillation. It has been used as a natural insect or pest deterrent. Godfrey's Cordial, as well as other tonics given to children that consisted of opiates, used sassafras to disguise other strong smells and odours associated with the tonics. It was also used as an additional flavouring to mask the strong odours of homemade liquor in the United States.

Commercial "sassafras oil," which contains safrole, is generally a byproduct of camphor production in Asia or comes from related trees in Brazil. Safrole is a precursor for the manufacture of the drug MDMA, as well as the drug MDA (3-4 methylenedioxyamphetamine) and as such, its transport is monitored internationally. Safrole is a List I precursor chemical according to the U.S. Drug Enforcement Administration.

The wood is dull orange brown, hard, and durable in contact with the soil; it was used in the past for posts and rails, small boats and ox-yokes, though scarcity and small size limits current use. Some is still used for making furniture.

History of commercial use 
Europeans were first introduced to sassafras, along with other plants such as cranberries, tobacco, and American ginseng, when they arrived in North America.

The aromatic smell of sassafras was described by early European settlers arriving in North America. According to one legend, Christopher Columbus found North America because he could smell the scent of sassafras. As early as the 1560s, French visitors to North America discovered the medicinal qualities of sassafras, which was also exploited by the Spanish who arrived in Florida. English settlers at Roanoke reported surviving on boiled sassafras leaves and dog meat during times of starvation.

Upon the arrival of the English on the Eastern coast of North America, sassafras trees were reported as plentiful. Sassafras was sold in England and in continental Europe, where it was sold as a dark beverage called "saloop" that had medicinal qualities and used as a medicinal cure for a variety of ailments. The discovery of sassafras occurred at the same time as a severe syphilis outbreak in Europe, when little about this terrible disease was understood, and sassafras was touted as a cure. Sir Francis Drake was one of the earliest to bring sassafras to England in 1586, and Sir Walter Raleigh was the first to export sassafras as a commodity in 1602.  Sassafras became a major export commodity to England and other areas of Europe, as a medicinal root used to treat ague (fevers) and sexually transmitted diseases such as syphilis and gonorrhea, and as wood prized for its beauty and durability.  Exploration for sassafras was the catalyst for the 1603 commercial expedition from Bristol of Captain Martin Pring to the coasts of present-day Maine, New Hampshire, and Massachusetts. During a brief period in the early 17th century, sassafras was the second-largest export from the British colonies in North America behind tobacco.

Since the bark was the most commercially valued part of the sassafras plant due to large concentrations of the aromatic safrole oil, commercially valuable sassafras could only be gathered from each tree once. This meant that as significant amounts of sassafras bark were gathered, supplies quickly diminished and sassafras become more difficult to find. For example, while one of the earliest shipments of sassafras in 1602 weighed as much as a ton, by 1626, English colonists failed to meet their 30-pound quota. The gathering of sassafras bark brought European settlers and Native Americans into contact sometimes dangerous to both groups. Sassafras was such a desired commodity in England, that its importation was included in the Charter of the Colony of Virginia in 1610.

Through modern times the sassafras plant, both wild and cultivated, has been harvested for the extraction of safrole, which is used in a variety of commercial products as well as in the manufacture of illegal drugs like MDMA; yet, sassafras plants in China and Brazil are more commonly used for these purposes than North American Sassafras albidum.

Gallery

See also 
 Filé powder
 Root beer
 Sarsaparilla
 Sassafras hesperia
 Sassafras randaiense
 Sassafras tzumu

References

External links

Dioecious plants
Lauraceae
Medicinal plants
Plants described in 1818
Trees of Ontario
Trees of the Eastern United States
Trees of North America
Trees of the Southeastern United States
Trees of the United States
Trees of the Northeastern United States
Trees of the Great Lakes region (North America)
Trees of the North-Central United States
Trees of the Southern United States